Ketola is a Finnish surname. Notable people with the surname include:

 Helen Ketola (1931–2016), American baseball player
 Juha-Pekka Ketola (born 1983), Finnish ice hockey player
 Tuomas Ketola (born 1975), Finnish tennis player
 Veli-Pekka Ketola (born 1948), Finnish ice hockey player and coach

Finnish-language surnames